Uzyanbash (Üźänbaş) is a rural locality (a selo) in Shigayevsky Selsoviet, Beloretsky District, Bashkortostan, Russia. The population was 636 as of 2010. There are 8 streets.

Geography 
Uzyanbash is located 42 km southwest of Beloretsk (the district's administrative centre) by road. Khusainovo is the nearest rural locality.

References 

Rural localities in Beloretsky District